Coralloides may refer to:
 Coralloides N.M.Wolf, 1776, a genus of fungi in the family Cladoniaceae, synonym of Cladonia
 Coralloides G.F.Hoffmann, 1789, a genus of fungi in the family Stereocaulaceae, synonym of Stereocaulon
 Coralloides de Tournefort ex Maratti, 1822, a genus of fungi in the family Gomphaceae, synonym of Ramaria